The 1991 season was the 61st season of competitive football in Ukraine which was an union republic within the Soviet Union. Teams from Ukraine competed in two types of competitions All-Union and republican.


Domestic leagues

Men

Soviet Top League 

Six Ukrainian teams (Chornomorets Odesa, Dynamo Kyiv, Dnipro Dnipropetrovsk, Shakhtar Donetsk, Metalurh Zaporizhia, and Metalist Kharkiv) play in this league, which also contains six teams from the Russian SFSR and four more from other union republics.

Overall standings

Soviet First League 

Two Ukrainian teams (Bukovyna Chernivtsi and Tavriya Simferopol) play in this league, which also contains 11 teams from the Russian SFSR and nine more teams from other union republics.

Overall standings

Soviet Second League 

Eleven Ukrainian teams (Karpaty Lviv, Zorya Luhansk, Nyva Ternopil, Nyva Vinnytsia, Torpedo Zaporizhzhia, Volyn Lutsk, SKA Odesa, Kremin Kreminchuk, Sudnobudivnyk Mykolaiv, FC Halychyna Drohobych, and Vorskla Poltava) play in this league and all in the west zone of the league. Beside Ukrainian teams in the west zone competed 11 other teams from various union republics. In whole there are three zones West, Center, and East.

Zone West

Soviet Lower Second League 

26 teams play in this league, all of which are based in Ukraine.

 Zone 1

Ukrainian championship among KFK 

94 teams play in this league, all of which are based in Ukraine.

Women

Soviet Top League 
Six Ukrainian teams (Arena Kyiv, Dnipro Dnipropetrovsk, Lehenda Chernihiv, Luhanochka Luhansk, Nyva-Olimp Kyiv and Dynamo Kyiv) play in this league, which also contains nine teams from the Russian SFSR and nine more teams from other union republics.

Overall standings

NB: total goal difference -3

Play-off (in Sevastopol)

Soviet First League 
Eight Ukrainian teams (Luys Simferopol, Bukovynka Chernivtsi, Chornomorochka Odesa, Svitlana Dnipropetrovsk, Nika Zaporizhia, ZSU Zaporizhia, Radosin Kyiv, and Debiut-88 Kharkiv play in this league, which also contains 18 teams from the Russian SFSR and six more teams from other union republics.

Soviet Second League 
Six Ukrainian teams (Elehiya Bobrovytsia, Atlanta Sevastopol, Yunist-Helios Luhansk, Mriya Kirovohrad, Azovchanka Mariupol, and Soyuz Kharkiv), which also contains 8 teams from the Russian SFSR and four more teams from other union republics.

NB: total goal difference -2

Kaluzhanka Kaluga – withdrew

Domestic cups

Men

Soviet Cup 

The last Ukrainian team Chornomorets Odesa was eliminated in quarterfinals. Since semifinals for the Soviet Cup played three Russian teams and Ararat Yerevan.

All Ukrainian teams withdrew the competition at quarterfinals due to dissolution of the Soviet Union. Since semifinals for the Soviet Cup played three Russian teams and Pamir Dushanbe.

Cup of the Ukrainian SSR 

The Cup of the Ukrainian SSR is a two-legged home-and-away series played among the Second League Ukrainian teams.

Temp won 3–2 on aggregate

Ukrainian Cup among KFK 

The Ukrainian Cup among KFK is a republican cup contested among collectives of physical culture (CPhC or KFK) which in the Soviet Union had an amateur status compered to teams of masters which served as an official term for professional teams. Since 1989 the competition was not conducted.

Women

Soviet Cup 
The Soviet is a domestic cup contested by women's teams at the top division. Two last Ukrainian teams were eliminated at quarterfinals (Dnipro Dnipropetrovsk and Lehenda Chernihiv).

Ukrainian clubs in international competition

1990–91 European competitions 

 FC Dynamo Kyiv eliminated from the European competitions.

1991–92 European competitions 

Dynamo Kyiv won 4–0 on aggregate.

Dynamo Kyiv won 2–1 on aggregate. Dynamo Kyiv qualified for the Group stage.

End of calendar year standing

Notes

References

External links 
 Ukrainian Association of Football

 
Seasons in Ukrainian football